Komb-e Moradabad (also Romanized as Komb-e Morādābād; also known as Komb) is a village in Kambel-e Soleyman Rural District, in the Central District of Chabahar County, Sistan and Baluchestan Province, Iran. At the 2006 census, its population was 4,531, in 909 families.

References 

Populated places in Chabahar County